Janice Dean Willis, or Jan Willis (born 1948) is Professor of Religion at Wesleyan University, where she has taught since 1977; and the author of books on Tibetan Buddhism. She has been called influential by Time Magazine, Newsweek (cover story), and Ebony Magazine. Aetna Inc.'s 2011 African American History Calendar features professor Willis as one of thirteen distinguished leaders of faith-based health initiatives in the United States.

Willis grew up in Docena, Alabama (near Birmingham), as the daughter of a Baptist deacon and steelworker. While traveling through Asia during the early 1970s, she became the student of Tibetan lama Thubten Yeshe, who encouraged her academic pursuits. She received BA and MA degrees in philosophy from Cornell University (thesis: History, Faith, and Kerygma; A Critique of Bultmann's Existentialist Theology.), and a Ph.D. in Indic and Buddhist Studies from Columbia University (dissertation: A Study of the Chapter on Reality Based Upon the Tattvartha-patalam of Asanga's Bodhisattvabhumi.).

Since 2006, she has contributed to the group blog On Faith (sponsored by Newsweek and the Washington Post) alongside Elie Wiesel, Desmond Tutu, and Madeleine Albright, among others. In 2003, she was awarded Wesleyan University's Binswanger Prize for Excellence in Teaching.

Publications
She is the author of the following books:

Dreaming Me: An African American Woman's Spiritual Journey. New York: Riverhead Books, 2001.
The Diamond Light: An Introduction to Tibetan Buddhist Meditation. New York: Simon & Schuster, 1972.
On Knowing Reality: The Tattvartha Chapter of Asanga's Bodhisattvabhumi. Columbia UP, 1979.
Enlightened Beings: Life Stories from the Ganden Oral Tradition. Wisdom Publications, 1995.
Feminine Ground: Essays on Women and Tibet. (Editor, and contributor of two of six, essays) Ithaca, NY: Snow Lion, 1989.

References

External links
Personal site 
"On Faith" (blog)

Other sources
Paine, Jeffrey. Re-Enchantment: Tibetan Buddhism Comes to the West. Norton, 2004.  Willis's experience with Lama Yeshe is discussed on pp. 64–70.

1948 births
Living people
Gelug Buddhists
Cornell University alumni
Columbia Graduate School of Arts and Sciences alumni
Converts to Buddhism
Wesleyan University faculty
African-American philosophers
Tibetan Buddhists from the United States
Tibetan Buddhism writers
American Buddhists
African-American writers
Foundation for the Preservation of the Mahayana Tradition
American scholars of Buddhism
American women philosophers
Religious philosophers
20th-century American philosophers
21st-century American philosophers
20th-century American women writers
21st-century American women writers
American women non-fiction writers
20th-century American non-fiction writers
21st-century American non-fiction writers
20th-century African-American women
21st-century African-American women writers
21st-century African-American writers